Breaksea Island is a rugged  island in the southwest of New Zealand, and is part of Fiordland National Park. It is covered in temperate rainforest and was the site of one of the first successful campaigns to eradicate rats from a sizeable island.

Rat eradication
The pioneering eradication of brown rats, using brodifacoum in poison baits, was carried out by the New Zealand Department of Conservation (DOC) in May and June 1988 following the success of a pilot campaign on the adjacent, and much smaller, Hāwea Island in 1986. At the time, Breaksea was six times the size of the previous largest island on which rat eradication had been successful.

Fauna
Fiordland crested penguins breed on Breaksea.  Since rat eradication various threatened species of New Zealand's native fauna have been introduced, or reintroduced, there.  These include the tieke (saddleback), mōhua (yellowhead), Fiordland skink and knobbled weevils.

See also

 List of islands of New Zealand
 List of islands
 Desert island

References

Notes

External links

 Fiordland Islands restoration

Uninhabited islands of New Zealand
Island restoration
Islands of Fiordland
Fiordland National Park